Clara Decortes (born 7 March 1996 Seriate ) is an Italian volleyball player. She plays as an opposite for Mondovì .

She debuted in Serie A1 comes in the 2020-21 season with  Millenium Brescia. In December, he moves to the Roma Volley Club ; she plays in the 2021-2022 season with them.

For the 2022-23 season, she is again engaged in the cadet championship, with Mondovì.

References

External links
 Top Scorer - Clara Decortes of SCA VS. ROM volleyball world

1996 births
Living people
Volleyball players